Samoa competed at the 2011 Summer Universiade in Shenzhen, China.

Athletics

References

Shot put results

Nations at the 2011 Summer Universiade
2011 in Samoan sport
Samoa at the Summer Universiade